Erik Valdemar Pettersson (6 September 1906 – 22 July 1974) was a Swedish long-distance runner. He competed in the men's 5000 metres at the 1932 Summer Olympics.

References

1906 births
1974 deaths
Athletes (track and field) at the 1932 Summer Olympics
Swedish male long-distance runners
Olympic athletes of Sweden
Place of birth missing